The 1946 Women's Western Open was a golf competition held at the Wakonda Club in Des Moines, Iowa, which was the 17th edition of the event. Louise Suggs won the championship in match play competition by defeating Patty Berg in the final match, 2-up.

Women's Western Open
Golf in Iowa
Women's sports in Iowa
Women's Western Open
Women's Western Open
Women's Western Open